Rungkunan National Park is a protected area of the Philippines located in the municipalities of Ditsaan-Ramain and Tagoloan II in Lanao del Sur, some 10 kilometers east-south-east of the provincial capital Marawi. The park covers the mountainous eastern section of Lanao del Sur near the Lake Lanao-Agus River Watershed Area known for its beautiful sparkling stream, virgin forest and invigorating climate. It was declared a national park in 1965 by virtue of Republic Act No. 4190.

References

See also
List of national parks of the Philippines

National parks of the Philippines
Protected areas established in 1965
1965 establishments in the Philippines
Geography of Lanao del Sur
Tourist attractions in Lanao del Sur